Lakeville  is an exurb of Minneapolis-Saint Paul, and the largest city in Dakota County, Minnesota, United States. Starting as a flourishing milling center, its agriculture industry and other major industries are still in operation. Lakeville is one of the fastest-growing cities in the Twin Cities area. The population was 69,490 at the 2020 census. making it Minnesota's tenth most populous city.

Lakeville first became notable in 1910 when Marion Savage built the Dan Patch Railroad Line to service his Antlers Amusement Park. While many of Lakeville's workers commute northward to Minneapolis, Saint Paul, and more central suburbs like Bloomington, Lakeville has had major industry since the 1960s—including the Airlake Industrial Park, which is served by Airlake Airport, a regional reliever airport.

History
A military road was constructed between Fort Snelling and forts to the south. In 1855, J.J. Brackett, a Saint Paul lumber baron and mail carrier using the road, decided to plant a site halfway between Saint Paul and Saint Peter on a lake he named Prairie Lake. The village was established as Lakeville Township in 1858.  Notoriety came when Colonel Marion Savage expanded his entertainment business by constructing Antlers Amusement Park in 1910. Riding on fame from his success with the Dan Patch racing horse and the park's popularity, the lake was renamed Lake Marion, and the rail line servicing the park named the Dan Patch Railroad Line.

With the mostly rural landscape, early settlers were farmers.  A high percentage were Scandinavian. Other ethnic groups included Irish, Scots, and English, each of whom had spread out from Hamilton Landing and Burnsville.  In Karen Miller's diary from 1840 to 1895, Danes reportedly outnumbered Norwegians; travel to Minneapolis was not uncommon for the rural township. Enggren's Grocery was a downtown staple since 1900 until it closed in 2006.

Lakeville's development later in the 20th century followed the typical pattern for the outer-ring suburban Twin Cities.  The town was officially incorporated as the City of Lakeville in 1967. It remained primarily agricultural, as postwar development did not immediately absorb Lakeville (as well as Interstate 35's later completion date). In the early 21st century, housing and population increases were due to rising land costs in the metropolitan area, causing Lakeville to become a boomtown.

Geography
Lakeville includes the Argonne Farms post-World War I settlement project which failed in the early 20th century and was redeveloped in the 21st century into typical suburban retail. Since it was a semi-autonomous village within Lakeville Township before the city's incorporation, it continues to appear today on maps as Argonne.

A branch of the Vermillion River flows through Lakeville.  Its headwaters are just west of the city limits in Credit River Township, and it flows eastward across Dakota County until it empties into the Mississippi River at the Wisconsin border.  Much of Lakeville drains into the Vermillion River watershed. North Creek, a major tributary of the Vermillion, begins its flow in northern Lakeville and flows eastward to meet the Vermillion near downtown Farmington just east of Lakeville.  The Vermillion River has been designated as a trout stream by the Minnesota Department of Natural Resources.

Climate
Lakeville's climate is classified as warm-summer humid continental with features of a hot-summer humid continental (Köppen Dfa).

Demographics

2010 census
As of the census of 2010, there were 55,954 people, 18,683 households, and 15,158 families residing in the city. The racial makeup of the city was 89.3% White, 2.5% African American, 0.4% Native American, 4.1% Asian, 1.2% from other races, and 2.5% from two or more races. Hispanic or Latino of any race were 3.5% of the population.

There were 18,683 households, of which 49.1% had children under the age of 18 living with them, 67.9% were married couples living together, 9.2% had a female householder with no husband present, 4.0% had a male householder with no wife present, and 18.9% were non-families. 14.0% of all households were made up of individuals, and 3.6% had someone living alone who was 65 years of age or older. The average household size was 2.99 and the average family size was 3.32.

The median age in the city was 34.8 years. 31.8% of residents were under the age of 18; 6.7% were between the ages of 18 and 24; 28.8% were from 25 to 44; 27% were from 45 to 64; and 5.8% were 65 years of age or older. The gender makeup of the city was 50.1% male and 49.9% female.

2000 census
As of the census of 2000, there were 43,128 people, 13,609 households, and 11,526 families residing in the city. The racial makeup of the city was 94.26% White, 1.28% African American, 0.38% Native American, 2.01% Asian, 0.02% Pacific Islander, 0.76% from other races, and 1.28% from two or more races. Hispanic or Latino of any race were 1.94% of the population.

There were 13,609 households, out of which 56.0% had children under the age of 18 living with them, 73.6% were married couples living together, 7.5% had a female householder with no husband present, and 15.3% were non-families. 10.7% of all households were made up of individuals, and 1.9% had someone living alone who was 65 years of age or older.  The average household size was 3.17 and the average family size was 3.43.

In the city the population was spread out, with 36.1% under the age of 18, 5.9% from 18 to 24, 37.8% from 25 to 44, 17.4% from 45 to 64, and 2.8% who were 65 years of age or older.  The median age was 32 years. For every 100 females there were 102.5 males.  For every 100 females age 18 and over, there were 100.6 males.

The median income for a household in the city was $72,404, and the median income for a family was $76,542 (these figures had risen to $90,014 and $96,662 respectively as of a 2007 estimate). Males had a median income of $51,405 versus $33,071 for females. The per capita income for the city was $26,492.  About 1.5% of families and 2.0% of the population were below the poverty line, including 2.0% of those under age 18 and 4.3% of those age 65 or over.

Economy

Airlake Industrial Park, developed by Maynard Johnson with colleagues at Bloomington-based Hitchcock Industries, is home to as many as 200 companies and an estimated 4,500 employees. The 1,500-acre park, one of the state's largest contiguous industrial parks, has attracted companies ranging from start-ups to large corporations.

Airlake Industrial Park was a contrived name – “air” represented the airport that Hitchcock Industries built on the grounds and “lake” signified nearby Lake Marion.

Lakeville is served by the Airlake Airport, which has a single runway with an ILS approach.  The airport is managed by the Metropolitan Airports Commission as a reliever facility to draw general aviation traffic. The FAA operates the Minneapolis ARTCC (air route traffic control center) in Farmington, several miles away from the airport.  This center provides traffic control services for Minnesota and surrounding states.

Large farms are still in operation, producing most of their revenue in corn, soybeans, and dairy cattle.

Post Consumer Brands has its headquarters in Lakeville since 2015.

Parks and recreation
Lakeville has many recreational opportunities. The Parks & Recreation Department maintains a total of 62 public properties, including neighborhood and community parks, athletic fields, playgrounds, greenways, trails, tennis courts, skating rinks, picnic areas, conservation areas, nature areas, several public fishing areas, swimming beaches, the City's Central Maintenance Facility, Senior Center, and the Lakeville Area Arts Center. Notable parks include Ritter Farm Park, North Park, Antlers Park, King Park, Valley Lake Park, and Aronson Park, which features a Veterans Memorial.

Antlers Park features a large swimming beach with volleyball courts, baseball diamonds, a playground area, water equipment, a picnic area, a fishing pier, and horseshoe pits. Orchard Lake Beach has a picnic area, shore fishing, playground equipment, and volleyball courts. Valley Lake Beach includes playground equipment, a picnic area, a walking trail around the lake, a fishing pier and seasonal restrooms.

Government

The city of Lakeville is governed by a five-member city council, including a mayor, although a City Administrator runs day-to-day municipal operations. A professional police force and volunteer fire department protect the city's residents. The city operates a large parks department which includes a senior center, an entertainment center, dozens of various neighborhood and community parks, and many miles of multipurpose trails.

Luke Hellier is the mayor of Lakeville. The city is in Minnesota's 2nd congressional district, represented since 2019 by Angie Craig. Lakeville is represented in the Minnesota Senate by District 57 Senator Zach Duckworth. In the Minnesota House, Lakeville is represented by District 57A Representative Jon Koznick, and District 57B Representative Jeff Witte.

Education
The city is served by three different school districts, whose boundaries were determined while the community was largely agricultural. Today Independent School District 196 ("Rosemount-Apple Valley-Eagan") and Farmington School District 192 serve parts of northern and eastern Lakeville. Most Lakeville households are served by Lakeville Area School District 194. In the fall of 2005, the Lakeville School District opened its second high school, Lakeville South. Some students attend public schools in other school districts chosen by their families under Minnesota's open enrollment statute. Lakeville North was a Blue Ribbon school of excellence in 2009. Each high school has nearly 2,000 students. There are eight public elementary schools and three public middle schools. Century Middle School students go on to attend Lakeville North, McGuire Middle School students go on to attend Lakeville South, and Kenwood Middle School students attend either school, depending on their neighborhood of residence.

Media
 Lakeville Sun Thisweek
 Farm Show newspaper has been published from Lakeville since 1976

Infrastructure

Transportation
Lakeville is directly served by Interstate 35, as well as Cedar Avenue/MN 77 to the east.

Before its abandonment in 1970, the Chicago, Milwaukee, St. Paul and Pacific Railroad's Hastings and Dakota Subdivision went through the center of Lakeville and served various industries. Short-line railroad Progressive Rail is based in Lakeville, and owns the right-of-way of the MN&S Subdivision between Lakeville and Northfield. Between Lakeville and Savage the MN&S Subdivision is owned by Canadian Pacific Railway, but has been out of service since the 1990s. In 2009 Progressive Rail began using a segment of the out-of-service tracks for railcar storage, causing local controversy. The Dan Patch Corridor would go through Lakeville, but has been banned from discussion and funding by the Minnesota State Legislature since 2002. The City of Lakeville opposes public funding of a passenger rail line on the MN and S Subdivision through the community.

Notable people
 Elisabeth Bachman, Olympic volleyball player
 Rachel Banham, University of Minnesota basketball player and WNBA player for the Connecticut Sun
 Bradley Ellingboe, composer
 Robert C. Jensen, Minnesota state legislator and farmer
 Kevin Kaesviharn, pro football player
 John Kline, U.S. Representative
 Paul Krause, Pro Football Hall of Famer, played for Minnesota Vikings
 Chelsea Laden, ice hockey goaltender, and reality-TV star
 Charlie Lindgren, professional ice hockey goaltender
 Bill Macklin, Minnesota state legislator, judge, and lawyer
 J.P. Macura, Charlotte Hornets basketball player
 Joey Miller, NASCAR driver
 Jake Oettinger, Boston University and Dallas Stars goaltender
 Janelle Pierzina, Big Brother contestant
 Ryan Poehling, St. Cloud State hockey player drafted by the Montreal Canadiens
 Joseph Andrew Quinn, Minnesota state legislator and lawyer
 Jordan Schroeder, National Hockey League (NHL) centerman for Columbus Blue Jackets
 Brady Skjei, University of Minnesota hockey player drafted by the New York Rangers
 Regan Smith,  Olympic swimmer
 Steve Strachan, former member of the Minnesota House of Representatives and former chief of the Lakeville Police Department

References

External links
 City website
 Lakeville Area Convention and Visitors Bureau
 Lakeville Area Chamber of Commerce

Cities in Dakota County, Minnesota
1855 establishments in Minnesota Territory
Populated places established in 1855
Cities in Minnesota